212 Warrior (also known as Wiro Sableng 212 and Wiro Sableng Pendekar Kapak Maut Naga Geni 212) is a 2018 Indonesian action-comedy film based on the Wiro Sableng novel series by Bastian Tito. The movie is the first collaboration between an Indonesian studio with Fox International Production.

A teaser for the film was released on 21 December 2017 throughout Indonesian theaters. It was uploaded online on a week later. The first trailer was released on 12 May 2018 and debuted on the LINE communications app. The film was released on 30 August 2018.

It was the last film from Fox International Productions before it was shut down in 2017 and was transferred to 20th Century Fox & Buena Vista International (after was acquired by Disney in 2019).

Premise
In the 16th century of Nusantara, Wiro Sableng (Vino G. Bastian) is tasked by his mentor Sinto Gendeng (Ruth Marini) to capture her treacherous former student, Mahesa Birawa (Yayan Ruhian). Joined by his friends, Anggini (Sherina Munaf) & Bujang Gila Tapak Sakti (Fariz Alfarizi), Wiro will not only discover Mahesa's evil intention, but will also discover his true calling as a hero.

Cast 
 Vino G. Bastian as Wiro Sableng
 Sherina Munaf as Anggini
 Marsha Timothy as Bidadari Angin Timur
 Fariz Alfarizi as Bujang Gila Tapak Sakti
 Happy Salma as Suci
 Dwi Sasono as Raja Kamandaka
 Yayan Ruhian as Mahesa Birawa
 Cecep Arif Rahman as Bajak Laut Bagaspati
 Lukman Sardi as Werku Alit
 Ruth Marini as Sinto Gendeng
 T. Rifnu Wikana as Kalasrenggi

References

External links
 

2018 films
Indonesian action comedy films
2018 action comedy films
Films based on Indonesian novels
20th Century Fox films